U Zwe Ohn Chein was a Burmese inventor, writer and teacher, best known for inventing a Burmese shorthand technique and writing books on Burmese shorthand and typewriting in Burma (Myanmar).

Early life and education
Zwe Ohn Chein, born Ohn Chein, the ninth of ten siblings, was born in Mandalay, Burma to wealthy rice merchants.  His parents lost their fortune during a storm. Zwe Ohn Chein then supported his parents by selling flowers.  After his parents passing, he went to Rangoon (Yangon) on a bicycle and became a clerical assistant at age 20.  As he was literate in English, he taught himself Pitman shorthand which he then used to invent his own Burmese shorthand technique in his later years.

Marriage and family
Zwe Ohn Chein married Daw Than Yi in 1939, and the couple had four children together.

Career
Zwe Ohn Chein started writing books on Burmese shorthand and typewriting in the 1950s after starting up Zwe Ohn Chein Shorthand College in 1946.  By around 1956, he had successfully established the College, published books on Burmese shorthand and typewriting, and was the headmaster and the controller of the College.  Around 1958, he won a contract with Remington typewriters  for his typewriting books to accompany the sale of each Remington Burmese typewriter in Burma.  As he had been unable to go to college due to his parents financial situation in his early years, even with the success of Zwe Ohn Chein Shorthand College, he felt unfulfilled and decided to study Burmese language at the University of Yangon.  He graduated with a Bachelor of Arts degree in 1962, around the same time his eldest daughter was studying at the Medical School of Rangoon University.

Legacy
After Zwe Ohn Chein's death in 1979, his widow Daw Than Yi became the headmistress and the controller of Zwe Ohn Chein Shorthand College until her death in 1997.

External links
 Long Live Pitman's Shorthand - A wealth of material and advice for learning Pitman's New Era
 The Joy of Pitman Shorthand - Brief explanation, list of links, and video in 3 parts demonstrating writing (linked to YouTube)

Shorthand systems
University of Yangon alumni
1979 deaths
1910 births